Agh Tavaraq (also Romanized as Āgh Ţavaraq; also known as Āq Ţavaraq) is a village in Kolah Boz-e Gharbi Rural District, in the Central District of Meyaneh County, East Azerbaijan Province, Iran. At the 2006 census, its population was 147, in 25 families.

References 

Populated places in Meyaneh County